Pseudochazara orestes, the Dils' grayling, is a species of butterfly in the family Nymphalidae. It is confined to Phalakron massif, Menikion mountains, Mount Orvilos – Greece; South Pirin mountains, precisely on the southern slopes of the Gradishte Hill in south-western Bulgaria.

Flight period 
The species is univoltine and is on wing from mid-June to late July.

Food plants
Larvae feed on grasses.

References

 Satyrinae of the Western Palearctic - Pseudochazara orestes

Pseudochazara
Butterflies described in 1981
Butterflies of Europe